Mari Gingery is an American climber. She has climbed in much of the Western United States particularly Joshua Tree, The Needles and Yosemite.

From 1979 to 1983, Gingery climbed with Lynn Hill every weekend in Yosemite, completing an ascent of The Nose and then the first female-only ascent of The Shield on El Capitan over a period of six days. Hill cites her as a significant influence on her climbing.

Gingery competed at sport climbing competition events, placing highly.

Gingery wrote one of the first guidebooks to focus only on bouldering in 1993, Joshua Tree Bouldering: Joshua Tree National Park. She also contributed to John Long's movie Rock Climbing: The Art Of Leading.

She lives both in Los Angeles and Joshua Tree with Mike Lechlinski with whom she frequently climbs, performing many first ascents in traditional style, often on-sight with no hang-dogging.

Selected first ascents
Big Moe:  – 1980
Witch Hunt:  – 1980
Popular Mechanics:  – 1977
White Trash  – 1991
Invisibility Lessons:  – 1978
Bighorn Dihedral:  – 1982
Elephant Walk - Joshua Tree:  – 1988

External links
 Video of Gingery on bouldering problem How's Your Momma in Joshua Tree:

References

American rock climbers
Female climbers
Living people
Sportspeople from Los Angeles
Year of birth missing (living people)
Place of birth missing (living people)
American sportswomen
21st-century American women